The 2014–15 Antigua and Barbuda Premier Division will be the 44th season of the Antigua and Barbuda top-flight football league. The league consists of 10 clubs that play 18 matches with a two-match series against each other club.

Teams
The league will be contested by 10 teams, including Ottos Rangers, Urlings Golden Stars and Five Islands, all of which were promoted from the 2013–14 Division 1. Willikies, All Saints United and Potters Tigers were each relegated. All games are played at Antigua Recreation Ground in St. John's. The stadium has a capacity of 9,000.

League table
The season began on 20 September 2014, with Bassa and Old Road playing to a scoreless draw.

Results

Season Statistics

Hat-tricks

References

External links
 http://antiguafootball.com/leagues-ta/premier-league/ 

1
Antigua
Antigua and Barbuda Premier Division seasons